The assassination of Orhan Gündüz, Turkish businessman and diplomat, took place on May 4, 1982, in Somerville, Massachusetts.

An Armenian gunman attacked and killed Orhan Gündüz, a Turkish honorary consul, while he waited in his automobile in rush-hour traffic near Union Square, Somerville. The gunman escaped. Justice Commandos of the Armenian Genocide (JCAG) claimed responsibility.

The assassination occurred six weeks after Gündüz was wounded in a bomb attack at his Central Square, Cambridge gift shop, Topkapi Imports, on March 22, before which JCAG threatened that Gündüz either resign as an honorary consul or be executed. Salespersons at Topkapi Imports commented that neither the store nor Gündüz had been given police protection despite the fact that the store had been the site of the prior bombing. There was, however, a significant police presence in the area of the store at all hours as it was on the same street as the Cambridge Police headquarters and about 150 feet away.

To help solve Gündüz's murder, local television and newspapers utilized a composite drawing based on information provided by a witness in order to apprehend the assassin. When the witness was subsequently gunned down, all community efforts to help apprehend the assassin came to a halt. The Somerville Police Department and FBI were never able to apprehend the assassin.

References

1982 in Massachusetts
1982 murders in the United States
Assassinated Turkish diplomats
Assassinations in the United States
Deaths by firearm in Massachusetts
History of Middlesex County, Massachusetts
Male murder victims
May 1982 crimes
May 1982 events in the United States
People murdered in Massachusetts
Somerville, Massachusetts
Terrorist attacks attributed to Armenian militant groups
Turkey–United States relations
Turkish people murdered abroad